Reggie Hanson (born October 6, 1968) is an American former professional basketball player who played for the Boston Celtics of the National Basketball Association (NBA). He is a former assistant coach for the University of South Florida Bulls men's basketball team and former head coach in Japan's Shimane Susanoo Magic. With the Celtics, Hanson appeared in 8 games, scoring 6 points in 26 minutes while on two ten-day contracts with the Celtics. He would be the last Celtic to wear #34 before Paul Pierce. He also played professionally in Japan. He played collegiately with the Kentucky Wildcats men's basketball team. Hanson was born in Charlotte, North Carolina and graduated from high school in Pulaski County, Kentucky.

Head coaching record

|- 
| style="text-align:left;"|Shimane Susanoo Magic
| style="text-align:left;"|2014
| 26||6||20|||| style="text-align:center;"|10th in Western|||-||-||-||
| style="text-align:center;"|-
|-
| style="text-align:left;"|Shimane Susanoo Magic
| style="text-align:left;"|2014
| 12||1||11|||| style="text-align:center;"|Fired|||-||-||-||
| style="text-align:center;"|-
|-

References

1968 births
Living people
Akita Isuzu/Isuzu Motors Lynx/Giga Cats players
American expatriate basketball people in Japan
American men's basketball players
Basketball players from Kentucky
Basketball players from Charlotte, North Carolina
Boston Celtics players
Kentucky Wildcats men's basketball coaches
Kentucky Wildcats men's basketball players
People from Pulaski County, Kentucky
Shimane Susanoo Magic coaches
Small forwards
South Florida Bulls men's basketball coaches
Sportspeople from Charlotte, North Carolina